Fermín Caballero y Morgáez (July 7, 1800 – June 17, 1876) was a Spanish geographer, journalist, writer, and liberal politician.

Works 
La Turquía, teatro de la guerra (1826)
Mapa exacto de la guerra de Turquía (1828)
Corrección fraterna al presbítero doctor don Sebastián Miñano, autor de un Diccionario geográfico estadístico de España y Portugal (1828)
La Turquía victoriosa (1829)
Cuadro político de las cinco partes del mundo (1829)
Añadurías a la corrección fraterna (1830)
El dique contra el torrente (1830)
La cordobada (1830)
Noticias sobre Turquía (1830)
Apuntamiento de historia (1831)
Nomenclatura Geográfica de España. Análisis gramatical y filosófico de los nombres de pueblos y lugares de la península, con aplicación a la topografía y la historia, Madrid, Imprenta de D. Eusebio Aguado, 1834.
Epítome y vocabulario de botánica (1834)
Manual de lengua inglesa (1834)
lnterrogatorio para la descripción de los pueblos (1834)
Las máximas de agricultura para los labradores de Barajas (1836)
Fisonomía de los procuradores a Cortes (1836)
El Gobierno y las Cortes del Estatuto (1837)
Fermín Caballero a sus detractores (1837)
Voz de alerta a los españoles constitucionales 1839)
Casamiento de doña María Cristina con don Fernando Muñoz (1840)
Manual de Geografía (1843).
Manual geográfico-administrativo de la monarquía española Madrid: Imp. Antonio Yenes, 1844.
Sinopsis geográfica, o toda la Geografía en un cuadro, 1848.
Fomento de la población rural Madrid: Imprenta Nacional, 1864. 2.ª ed. Memoria premiada por la Academia de Ciencias morales y políticas, en el concurso de 1863. Segunda edición adicionada,        Madrid, Imprenta y Librería de D. E. Aguado, 1863. Traducida al portugués en 1872. Hay edición moderna: Barcelona, El Albir, 1980.
Reseña geográfica de España para la Exposición de París (1867)
La imprenta en Cuenca. Datos para la historia del Arte Tipográfico en España. Cuenca, Imp. de El Eco, 1869.Noticias del doctor Don Nicolás Herrero (1868)
"Proyecto de división territorial de España para todos los ramos del servicio" (1871)Pericia geográfica de Miguel de Cervantes Saavedra, demostrada en la historia de D. Quijote de la Mancha  Madrid: Imprenta de Yenes, 1840.Conquenses ilustres (Abate Hervás, Melchor Cano, Doctor Montalvo, Alonso y Juan de Valdés). Madrid: Colegio Nacional de Sordo Mudos y Ciegos, I, Noticias biográficas y bibliográficas del Abate d. Lorenzo Hervás y Panduro: 1868; II, Vida del Illmo. Melchor Cano: 1871; III, Doctor Montalvo: 1873; IV, Alonso y Juan de Valdés'': 1875 (4 vols.).

Progressive Party (Spain) politicians
1800 births
1876 deaths